Andy Sugden (also Hopwood) is a fictional character from the British ITV soap opera, Emmerdale, played by Kelvin Fletcher. He made his first on-screen appearance on 4 July 1996. Andy is the son of Billy Hopwood (David Crellin) and Trisha Hopwood and the adoptive son of Jack Sugden (Clive Hornby) and Sarah Sugden (Alyson Spiro).

Storylines

Andy arrives in Emmerdale and is fostered by Jack (Clive Hornby) and Sarah Sugden (Alyson Spiro), but finds it difficult to settle with the Sugden family. While on-site at a quarry, his foot lodges on a rock and gets trapped, forcing Jack to rescue him. When his father, Billy Hopwood (David Crellin), visits Emmerdale, Andy is persuaded to move into a caravan with him and disown the Sugdens. Billy breaks his promise to change and returns to committing petty crimes, up to the point where he robs the local post office and ends up killing its owner – Vic Windsor (Alun Lewis). In light of Vic's death and the post office incident, Billy is arrested and Andy moves back in with the Sugdens.

By then, Andy has grown close with his Jack and Sarah's young son Robert (Christopher Smith). This continues as the pair grow concerned when Jack and Sarah begin arguing over the farm. Sarah is annoyed with Jack for keeping Andy and off school to work on the farm. The subsequent discovery that Sarah is having an affair with Richie Carter (Glenn Lamont) causes the family to break up. Jack is awarded custody of Robert while Sarah is awarded custody of Robert's little sister Victoria (Hannah Midgley). Andy decides to stay with Jack. When the farm faces financial ruin, Andy decides to set fire to the barn for the insurance payout. However, Sarah and Richie are in the barn; the fire ends up killing Sarah and putting Richie in hospital. Richie blames Jack for the fire, but withdraws his statement to protect Andy.

Andy soon begins dating Katie Addyman (Sammy Winward), and goes to a nightclub with her along with other local residents; Eve Jenson (Raine Davison), Marc Reynolds (Anthony Lewis), Ollie Reynolds (Vicky Binns), and Donna Windsor (Verity Rushworth). Also involved on the trip is Robert (now Karl Davies), who has now resented Andy after learning the truth about how their mother died. When the group miss the bus, they steal a car and accidentally kill their headteacher Barbara Strickland (Alex Hall) along the way back to the village. They attempt to cover up their crime and burn the car. After living with guilt, the group confess and everyone apart from Marc – who was driving – is given community service. Katie's father Brian (Martin Reeve) disapproves of Andy and resolves to split them up. They decide to have a baby in an attempt to change his mind, but when Brian learns that Katie is pregnant, he sends her to live with her mother. She returns and moves in with Andy, but has a miscarriage. Despite this, she and Andy start planning their wedding. Katie, however, feels neglected by Andy working long hours and turns to Robert for excitement. Their affair is discovered by Victoria, as well as Andy's half-brother Daz Eden. However, Andy refuses to believe Daz and puts him into care – while Robert threatens Victoria into staying quiet until Jack eventually discovers the affairs. When the marriage fails, Katie and Robert admit their affair. Andy tries to shoot Robert, but hits Jack by mistake. He initially disowns Andy, but the pair are eventually reconciled after recounting that Robert and Kate are to blame due to their betrayal.

When Das returns, Daz invites him and his friend Debbie Dingle (Charley Webb) to move in – needing the rent money. Debbie is attracted to Andy and loses her virginity to him. They start dating secretly, but then her family learn about this and Andy is confronted by Debbie's father Cain (Jeff Hordley) about the revelation. He later ends the relationship with Debbie after Cain threatens to lead Daz into criminal activities unless Andy leaves Debbie alone. Andy briefly dates Libby Charles (Ty Glaser) afterwards, but then discovers that Debbie has given birth to his baby – Sarah. He and Debbie soon break up, agreeing to keep in contact, but Debbie's decision to give Sarah to Emily Kirk (Kate McGregor) upsets Andy. Things get worse when Katie discover that Andy is Sarah's father. When she is involved in a car accident, Andy breaks up with Debbie to get back with her. They soon resume their relationship, annoying the Sugdens, but Andy later has an affair with Kate's new friend Jo Stiles (Roxanne Pallett). When he realises that he is using Jo to get revenge for Katie and Robert's affair, she manipulates him into continuing the affair. Emily returns Sarah to Andy; when Debbie finds out, she gives Andy custody.

Katie struggles to look after Sarah and start a stable business. Meanwhile, Andy sees Jo is better with Sarah and restarts their affair. Andy is about to tell Katie, when she announces that she could be pregnant; this turns out to be a false alarm. Andy tells her about his and Jo's affair. Katie throws them out but they return, since Andy is the leaseholder; Katie then moves out instead and moves her business to Home Farm. Andy and Katie subsequently separate.

Victoria (now played by Isabel Hodgins) begins looking for answers to the cause of Sarah Sr's death. In an attempt to force a confession, she douses the furniture in petrol and demands the truth; Andy confesses but a fire soon ignites.  In January 2008 he is sentenced to three years imprisonment for manslaughter.  Andy and Jo marry on 19 February 2008 in prison. Jack, Victoria, Daz, and Laurel are their guests and Ashley presides over the service. During Andy's incarceration, Debbie gets closer to Sarah and changes her mind about Jo adopting her. When Andy is released, he is angry to learn that Debbie has been allowed access and begins lashing out at Jo. The abuse continues for months and culminates in Andy getting seriously injured during a confrontation in a barn. Andy's family do not believe Jo initially but Daz and Victoria eventually see for themselves. After a suicide threat, Diane intervenes and arranges for Andy to get psychiatric treatment. Jo eventually leaves after Lee Naylor (Lewis Linford) helps her sell the farm equipment to fund her escape as Jo herself divorces from Andy off-screen in 2009.

Jack dies and leaves a letter for Diane to read at his funeral, in which he requests that Andy become the head of the family. Andy refuses at first but agrees after he sees Robert watching from a distance. When Robert sees Andy, he tells him that there was nothing for him in Emmerdale and leaves again.

Following Debbie's release from prison for allegedly murdering Shane Doyle, she requests more access to Sarah which Andy is unhappy about. Debbie warns him that she will not give up without a fight. During this time, Andy begins dating Maisie Wylde (Alice Coulthard), much to her family's chagrin. The hearing approaches and after realizing he cannot win, he withdraws his application for custody and Sarah goes to live with Debbie. Andy suffers a breakdown, letting the farm slide and is diagnosed with clinical depression. As time passes and he recovers, Andy works on rebuilding bridges with others in the village. He resumes work as a farmhand for the Barton family who take over the tenancy at Butlers and begins a relationship with Adele Allfrey (Tanya Vital) but this breaks down when Andy's temper and jealousy get the better of him; Adele leaves the village. Andy tries to reconcile with Katie and they sleep together on one occasion but Katie wants only to remain friends. Andy is jealous when Katie starts dating police officer Nick Henshall and is later accused of starting the fire that kills Viv and Terry Woods (Billy Hartman). It is later revealed Nick Henshall (Michael McKell) started the fire to try to frame Andy because of his previous crime. Henshall is arrested after kidnapping Katie and holds her hostage but she escapes when Henshall kills himself.

Sarah becomes ill and is diagnosed with Fanconi anaemia, a genetic disorder which could kill her without treatment. Debbie and Andy start looking for donors and find one but they pull out at the last moment. It is suggested to them that another baby or 'Saviour Sibling' could save their sick child. They apply for IVF but are turned down when the hospital learn that they are not a genuine couple as they need to be to qualify for funding for IVF. Debbie then suggests they try artificial insemination despite their partners Cameron Murray (Dominic Power) and Alicia Gallagher (Natalie Anderson) being unhappy. Their attempts are unsuccessful. Debbie believes the only way to conceive is for them to sleep together. Andy eventually agrees, angering Alicia who leaves Andy; Cameron still supports Debbie. They plan to sleep together but Debbie walks out, leaving Andy humiliated. Desperate to save her daughter, she changes her mind later and seduces him, but doesn't tell Cameron and Andy is confused by his feelings for Debbie. Jealous of Cameron, he turns up at Tug Ghyll at every opportunity. Debbie discovers she is pregnant and Andy is delighted, while Cameron feels left out but believes the baby was a result of artificial insemination. Cameron becomes angry that Andy won't leave Debbie alone, and warns him to stay away.

When John dies in a car accident after skidding on ice in Andy's Land Rover, Andy is guilt ridden after he finds out and thinks his car was the cause of the accident. John's widow, Moira Barton (Natalie J. Robb), assures him it was icy and that he is not to blame. Andy breaks down and tells Moira he feels like he has lost a brother after he and Moira talk about his and the Bartons' first meeting on the farm. Debbie tries to console Andy and, much to her surprise, he confesses his love for her but she breaks his heart by telling him that she loves Cameron. After Cameron warns Andy off, Andy reveals in a rage the baby was conceived naturally, not artificially. Following tests, Andy and Debbie discover the child is a match and they are delighted. Andy finds himself close to Katie again when he gives her advice after she leaves her ex-husband, Declan Macey (Jason Merrells). This leads to Declan and Andy fighting in The Woolpack. When Katie returns to fight for her marriage only a week later, Andy welcomes her back but warns Declan to start treating her the way she deserves.

Andy takes in Kerry Wyatt (Laura Norton) after her daughter Amy (Chelsea Halfpenny) throws her out. He confides in Kerry about his past and they bond over what they have been through. She cooks dinner for Andy and he tells her to stay another night as they kiss. Debbie goes into labour in October and gives birth to a boy and they name him Jack after Andy's late adoptive father. Andy and Amy share a kiss and Amy eventually tells Kerry. After a heated argument with Amy and her foster mother Val Pollard (Charlie Hardwick), Kerry slaps Amy, shocking Andy. Andy's relationship with Kerry comes to an end after Sarah and Jack are left in danger when Kerry gets drunk and drops a cigarette, starting a fire. Desperate to win Andy back, Kerry tells him she is pregnant but after a hit and run incident with Adam Barton (Adam Thomas) and Robbie Lawson (Jamie Shelton), she tells Andy that she was never pregnant but that she loves him. Angry at her behaviour, he rejects her and dates Amy for a while. However, that ends after she kidnaps the son she gave up for adoption and plans to leave the country with him. Eric, Val and Cain catch up with Amy and she is persuaded to return Kyle to his grandmother but chooses to stay on the ferry, fearing criminal prosecution. Val blames Andy for not being able to make Amy stay in the village.

In 2014, Andy starts a romantic relationship with his former stepsister, Bernice Blackstock (Samantha Giles) after helping her out setting up her beauty salon. They share a kiss and have sex. They begin to date and initially keep their romance a secret. At the opening night of Bernice's beauty salon, Bernice's father, Rodney Blackstock (Patrick Mower) along with Kerry, Nicola King (Nicola Wheeler) and Dan Spencer (Liam Fox) arrive at the salon and catch Andy and Bernice kissing. Later in 2014, Andy suffers an accident to his arm while working at Butlers Farm which is caused by Adam. Andy and Adam have a feud over the incident and over Andy's compensation money. Bernice does her best to support Andy through this. Katie accompanies Andy to a hospital appointment. When they arrive back from the hospital, Andy kisses Katie which Bernice witnesses from her window. Bernice is devastated and Andy later ends the relationship and reunites with Katie. Bernice returns a few weeks later after going to Australia, determined to win Andy back. Andy announces that he and Katie are back together and Andy's daughter, Sarah is pleased at their reunion. On Katie's birthday, Andy proposes to Katie which she accepts and they begin planning to remarry. In October 2014, Andy's adoptive brother and Katie's ex-boyfriend, whom Katie had an affair with during her previous marriage to Andy, Robert (now Ryan Hawley) returns to the village with his fiancée, Chrissie White (Louise Marwood), future father-in-law Lawrence White (John Bowe) and future stepson, Lachlan White (Thomas Atkinson). Katie disapproves of Robert's return and so does Andy as he hasn't forgiven him for the affair. Katie and Robert become embroiled in a feud with Robert trying to sabotage the wedding. They plan a Christmas wedding and eventually remarry on 25 December 2014. Andy's second marriage to Katie hits the rocks due to Katie's continual feud with Robert. Andy and Katie plan to buy Wylies Farm and restore it. Robert tries to sabotage the sale as his future father-in-law, Lawrence White owns the farm. Robert later sets fire to Katie and Andy's caravan which they are living in while the work gets done, in an act of revenge against Katie. Katie is also convinced that Robert is cheating on Chrissie with another woman. Robert cottons on to this and tries to lead Katie on by pretending it is Alicia. Katie confronts Robert over his "other woman" on numerous occasions in The Woolpack, which Robert denies.

In February 2015, Katie dies after finally discovering that Robert had been having an affair with a man, Aaron Livesy (Danny Miller). Robert does not want Chrissie to find out so he pushes Katie and she falls through rotting floorboards, breaking her neck and killing her. Andy is devastated by Katie's death and begins to spiral in to depression and tries to commit suicide. Robert comforts Andy and lets him move into Home Farm. While trying to move on from Katie, Andy begins a sexual relationship with Tracy Shankley (Amy Walsh), and also makes a move on ex-girlfriend, Bernice. He later ends his relationship with Tracey after realizing that the relationship isn't right, and eventually gets back on the straight and narrow. A few months later, Andy discovers one of Katie's phone bills. He checks it and realizes that the last number to call Katie was Aaron. He confronts Aaron and he finally admits that he has been having an affair with Robert and that Robert murdered Katie. Andy is furious and tries to convince everyone that Robert murdered her. Nobody believes Andy, and everyone believes that he is having a breakdown. He also phones the police but Robert denies everything and is released. Andy goes up to Butler's Farm to get hold of a gun. When he cannot find a gun he is angry. While trying to find the gun, Ross Barton (Michael Parr) walks in and asks Andy what is wrong. Andy admits that he is looking for a gun to go and shoot Robert as he murdered Katie. Ross reveals that he was also going to shoot his own brother Pete Barton (Anthony Quinlan) as he had left him for dead following a fight over Ross' affair with Debbie. Andy and Ross eventually go to Ross' house where they agree to shoot each other's brother therefore giving them an alibi with no evidence that either of them was involved in either of the shootings. Later that night, Ross shoots Robert on Andy's behalf, although he survives and Andy backs out of the plan to kill Pete.

Andy has sex with Bernice the night before her marriage to Lawrence. Bernice tells Andy she will call off the wedding if he assures her they can have a relationship. Andy turns her down, saying their fling was a mistake, while Bernice confesses everything to Lawrence. Having a change of heart, Andy goes in pursuit of Bernice to win her back, but arrives too late: he witnesses her marrying Lawrence. He later begins a relationship with Chrissie, Lawrence's daughter and brother Robert's estranged wife. After Bernice's marriage to Lawrence ends and Chrissie argues with him, Andy and Bernice once again sleep together. In July 2016, after Chrissie finds out about the fling, she plants the gun that her son, Lachlan, used to shoot Lawrence in Andy's car to frame him for the crime. He is arrested and charged with attempted murder. Chrissie also blackmails Andy's barrister, Rakesh Kotecha (Pasha Bocarie), into persuading Andy to plead guilty. To their shock, Andy pleads not guilty at his hearing. Immediately afterwards, while convening in Andy's cell, Rakesh, feeling sorry for Andy, tells him to escape. When the prison warden opens the cell door, Andy pushes Rakesh into the warden and flees. He returned to Home Farm, where he discovered the truth about Chrissie. He threatens to go to the police and tell them the truth, but, desperate to make Andy suffer, she cuts herself with a knife and tries to frame Andy with it. However, Andy went on the run again before the police could catch him. He is found by his brother Robert, who agrees to help him take down Chrissie. Andy decides he has to leave the village, and Robert procures a false passport for him under the name Brian Moore. He went to his late wife Katie's grave to say goodbye and Bernice later finds him and agrees to run away with him but changes her mind when she realises how much she has to lose. They emotionally say their last goodbyes to each other and Andy leaves the village.

Development

Return of Robert Sugden
In September 2014, the news was confirmed that Andy's adoptive brother Robert Sugden would be returning to Emmerdale after a five-year absence, now portrayed by Ryan Hawley. It was announced that Andy and Robert's old feud would be continued on, with Andy punching Robert almost immediately after the latter's reintroduction. However, as Andy's time on the programme came to an end, the brothers reignited their brotherly love, and in one of Andy's final scenes, the two called each other brother and hugged.

Departure
After many months of much speculation, on 1 August 2016, Fletcher confirmed his decision to leave the programme, ending his twenty-year stint, with his exit scenes being broadcast on 16 August. and Fletcher confirmed that he would be focusing on his career as a rally driver full-time, which was one of the major factors leading to his departure.

Reception
The episode which saw Andy set fire to the barn won the "Spectacular Scene of the Year" award at the 2001 British Soap Awards. The character was selected as one of the "top 100 British soap characters" by industry experts for a poll to be run by What's on TV, with readers able to vote for their favourite character to discover "Who is Soap's greatest Legend?" A reporter writing for the Inside Soap Yearbook described Andy as a "soap favourite".

References

External links
Andy Sugden at itv.com
Andy Sugden at What's on TV

Emmerdale characters
Adoptee characters in television
Fictional farmers
Television characters introduced in 1996
Fictional murderers
Fictional domestic abusers
Fictional criminals in soap operas
Male villains
Fictional attempted suicides
Fictional prisoners and detainees
Male characters in television
Fictional teenage parents